Yulia Paliychuk (born 27 May 1987, Shepetivka, Khmelnytskyi Oblast, Ukraine) is a Ukrainian spokeswoman, journalist, jurist, entrepreneur and politician.

Since September 2019, she became the spokeswoman of the Servant of the People in the Verkhovna Rada of Ukraine.

Journalist career 

In 2007—2009 she worked as a correspondent for Gazeta 24.

In 2009—2015, Paliychuk was a parliamentary correspondent for the online publication MIGnews.

In 2010—2012 she worked for the RBC Ukraine news agency as a parliamentary correspondent. In 2013, Paliychuk worked for the Focus magazine as a parliamentary correspondent.

Entrepreneurship 

In 2015, she founded the women's clothing brand PALIYCHUK.

Political career 

In July 2019, Paliychuk was a candidate for People's Deputies of Ukraine, 50150 in the electoral list of the political party Servant of the People.

References 

Living people
1987 births
People from Shepetivka
Ukrainian journalists
Ukrainian businesspeople
Businesspeople in fashion